Matthew V. Scannapieco (born May 21, 1944) served as Mayor of Marlboro, New Jersey from 1992 to 2003. During the course of his career in public service, Scannapieco, a Republican, also served on the Township Council, the Planning Board and the Zoning Board of Adjustment. During  his tenure, as mayor he not only sat on the planning board but also appointed all but one of the other members. During this time, Marlboro township experienced a 40 percent increase in housing units in Marlboro, or nearly 3,500 new units. In 2005, in the case of United States of America v. Matthew V. Scannapieco, he was charged with illegally accepting cash payments to influence planning processes and tax evasion.

Legal problems
Scannapieco pleaded guilty to accepting $245,000 in bribes from several land developers. On June 20, 2008, Matthew Scannapieco was sentenced to serve nearly two years in prison. The sentence was reduced from 15 years as the ex-mayor helped authorities in their probe of corruption in the Monmouth County township, specifically, the prosecution of three major developers including Anthony Spalliero.

The former mayor also pleaded guilty to tax evasion, specifically for failing to pay federal taxes on the money he accepted from several land developers involved with W.B. Associates.

Specific payments
Scannapieco admitted receiving the following corrupt payments in exchange for his official action:
$25,000 in 1997, in exchange for supporting the developer's project on Texas Road;
$60,000 in 1997 and 1998, in exchange for supporting the rezoning of property south of Woodcliff Boulevard.
$25,000 in 1999, for working to settle a dispute between the developer and Marlboro Township regarding the developer's rights on Dutch Lane, Vanderburg Road, and Pleasant Valley Road.
$100,000 in 2001 and 2002, for supporting rezoning property located on and around the former Marlboro Airport site.
$10,000 in 2001 or 2002, for persuading an elected state official to assist the developer in procuring an easement across a railroad line near Dutch Lane and Buckley Road.
$25,000 in 2002 and 2003, for supporting approvals to construct a large retail store on Routes 9 and 520.
In pleading guilty to tax evasion, Scannapieco admitted that he did not report to the IRS any of the bribe payments he received from the developer. A certified public accountant and certified financial auditor, Scannapieco also admitted that he regularly purchased cashier's checks and postal money orders – in structured amounts and with cash to avoid federal cash-transaction reports – and used the cashier's checks and money orders for personal expenses. Scannapieco admitted that between tax years 1998 and 2002, he failed to pay more than $80,000 in additional taxes.

Rape
In August 2015, he pleaded guilty to child sexual abuse. His victim, a relative, was six years old at the start of the abuse, which lasted two years. Scannapieco sexually abused the girl over a three-year period while awaiting sentencing in federal court after pleading guilty to the tax and bribery charges in 2005. Arrested in August 2014 and charged with sexually abusing the girl, he pleaded guilty in May to continuous sexual abuse of a child, rape, and unlawful sexual contact. The judge sentenced Scannapieco to 58 years total on sexual abuse charges—a mandatory 25 years behind bars and then 33 years' probation.

References 

Living people
American people of Italian descent
American people convicted of tax crimes
American people convicted of child sexual abuse
Mayors of places in New Jersey
People from Middletown, Delaware
1944 births
New Jersey Republicans
New Jersey politicians convicted of crimes